Dual-energy X-ray absorptiometry (DXA, or DEXA) is a means of measuring bone mineral density (BMD) using spectral imaging. Two X-ray beams, with different energy levels, are aimed at the patient's bones. When soft tissue absorption is subtracted out, the bone mineral density (BMD) can be determined from the absorption of each beam by bone. Dual-energy X-ray absorptiometry is the most widely used and most thoroughly studied bone density measurement technology.

The DXA scan is typically used to diagnose and follow osteoporosis, as contrasted to the nuclear bone scan, which is sensitive to certain metabolic diseases of bones in which bones are attempting to heal from infections, fractures, or tumors. It is also sometimes used to assess body composition.

Physics
Soft tissue and bone have different attenuation coefficients to X-rays.  A single X-ray beam passing through the body will be attenuated by both soft tissue and bone, and it is not possible to determine, from a single beam, how much attenuation was attributable to the bone.  However, the attenuation coefficients vary with the energy of the X-rays, and, crucially, the ratio of the attenuation coefficients also varies.  DXA uses two energies of X-ray.  The difference in total absorption between the two can be used, by suitable weighting, to subtract out the absorption by soft tissue, leaving just the absorption by bone, which is related to bone density.

One type of DXA scanner uses a cerium filter with a tube voltage of 80 kV, resulting in effective photon energies of about 40 and 70 keV. There is also a DXA scanner type using a samarium filter with a tube voltage of 100 kV, resulting in effective energies of 47 and 80 keV. Also, the tube voltage can be continuously switched between a low (for example 70 kV) and high (for example 140 kV) value in synchronism with the
frequency of the electrical mains, resulting in effective energies alternating between 45 and 100 keV.

The combination of dual X-ray absorptiometry and laser uses the laser to measure the thickness of the region scanned, allowing for varying proportions of lean soft tissue and adipose tissue within the soft tissue to be controlled for and improving the accuracy.

Bone density measurement

Indications

The U.S. Preventive Services Task Force recommends that women over the age of 65 should get a DXA scan. The date at which men should be tested is uncertain but some sources recommend age 70. At risk women should consider getting a scan when their risk is equal to that of a normal 65-year-old woman.

A person's risk can be measured using the University of Sheffield's FRAX calculator, which includes many different clinical risk factors including prior fragility fracture, use of glucocorticoids, heavy smoking, excess alcohol intake, rheumatoid arthritis, history of parental hip fracture, chronic renal and liver disease, chronic respiratory disease, long-term use of phenobarbital or phenytoin, celiac disease, inflammatory bowel disease, and other risks.

Scoring

The World Health Organization has defined the following categories based on bone density in white women:

Bone densities are often given to patients as a T score or a Z score. A T score tells the patient what their bone mineral density is in comparison to a young adult of the same gender with peak bone mineral density. A normal T score is -1.0 and above, low bone density is between -1.0 and -2.5, and osteoporosis is -2.5 and lower. A Z score is just a comparison of what a patient's bone mineral density is in comparison to the average bone mineral density of a male or female of their age and weight.

The WHO committee did not have enough data to create definitions for men or other ethnic groups.
 
Special considerations are involved in the use of DXA to assess bone mass in children. Specifically, comparing the bone mineral density of children to the reference data of adults (to calculate a T-score) will underestimate the BMD of children, because children have less bone mass than fully developed adults. This would lead to an over-diagnosis of osteopenia for children. To avoid an overestimation of bone mineral deficits, BMD scores are commonly compared to reference data for the same gender and age (by calculating a Z-score).

Also, there are other variables in addition to age that are suggested to confound the interpretation of BMD as measured by DXA. One important confounding variable is bone size. DXA has been shown to overestimate the bone mineral density of taller subjects and underestimate the bone mineral density of smaller subjects. This error is due to the way by which DXA calculates BMD. In DXA, bone mineral content (measured as the attenuation of the X-ray by the bones being scanned) is divided by the area (also measured by the machine) of the site being scanned.

Because DXA calculates BMD using area (aBMD: areal Bone Mineral Density), it is not an accurate measurement of true bone mineral density, which is mass divided by a volume. In order to distinguish DXA BMD from volumetric bone-mineral density, researchers sometimes refer to DXA BMD as an areal bone mineral density (aBMD). The confounding effect of differences in bone size is due to the missing depth value in the calculation of bone mineral density. Despite DXA technology's problems with estimating volume, it is still a fairly accurate measure of bone mineral content. Methods to correct for this shortcoming include the calculation of a volume that is approximated from the projected area measure by DXA. DXA BMD results adjusted in this manner are referred to as the bone mineral apparent density (BMAD) and are a ratio of the bone mineral content versus a cuboidal estimation of the volume of bone. Like the results for aBMD, BMAD results do not accurately represent true bone mineral density, since they use approximations of the bone's volume. BMAD is used primarily for research purposes and is not yet used in clinical settings.

Other imaging technologies such as quantitative computed tomography (QCT) are capable of measuring the bone's volume, and are, therefore, not susceptible to the confounding effect of bone-size in the way that DXA results are susceptible.

It is important for patients to get repeat BMD measurements done on the same machine each time, or at least a machine from the same manufacturer. Error between machines, or trying to convert measurements from one manufacturer's standard to another can introduce errors large enough to wipe out the sensitivity of the measurements.

DXA results need to be adjusted if the patient is taking strontium supplements.

DXA can also used to measure trabecular bone score.

Current clinical practice in pediatrics
DXA is, by far, the most widely used technique for bone mineral density measurements, since it is considered to be cheap, accessible, easy to use, and able to provide an accurate estimation of bone mineral density in adults.

The official position of the International Society for Clinical Densitometry (ISCD) is that a patient may be tested for BMD if they have a condition that could precipitate bone loss, is going to be prescribed pharmaceuticals known to cause bone loss, or is being treated and needs to be monitored. The ISCD states that there is no clearly understood correlation between BMD and the risk of a child's sustaining a fracture; the diagnosis of osteoporosis in children cannot be made using the basis of a densitometry criteria. T-scores are prohibited with children and should not even appear on DXA reports. Thus, the WHO classification of osteoporosis and osteopenia in adults cannot be applied to children, but Z-scores can be used to assist diagnosis.

Some clinics may routinely carry out DXA scans on pediatric patients with conditions such as nutritional rickets, lupus, and Turner syndrome. DXA has been demonstrated to measure skeletal maturity and body fat composition and has been used to evaluate the effects of pharmaceutical therapy. It may also aid pediatricians in diagnosing and monitoring treatment of disorders of bone mass acquisition in childhood.

However, it seems that DXA is still in its early days in pediatrics, and there are widely acknowledged limitations and disadvantages with DXA. A view exists that DXA scans for diagnostic purposes should not even be performed outside specialist centers, and, if a scan is done outside one of these centers, it should not be interpreted without consultation with an expert in the field. Furthermore, most of the pharmaceuticals given to adults with low bone mass can be given to children only in strictly monitored clinical trials.

Whole-body calcium measured by DXA has been validated in adults using in-vivo neutron activation of total body calcium but this is not suitable for paediatric subjects and studies have been carried out on paediatric-sized animals.

Body composition measurement

DXA scans can also be used to measure total body composition and fat content with a high degree of accuracy comparable to hydrostatic weighing with a few important caveats. From the DXA scans, a low resolution "fat shadow" image can also be generated, which gives an overall impression of fat distribution throughout the body It has been suggested that, while very accurately measuring minerals and lean soft tissue (LST), DXA may provide skewed results due to its method of indirectly calculating fat mass by subtracting it from the LST and/or body cell mass (BCM) that DXA actually measures.

DXA scans have been suggested as useful tools to diagnose conditions with an abnormal fat distribution, such as familial partial lipodystrophy. They are also used to assess adiposity in children, especially to conduct clinical research.

Radiation exposure
DXA uses X-rays to measure bone mineral density. The radiation dose of current DEXA systems is small, as low as 0.001 mSv, much less than a standard chest or dental x-ray. However, the dose delivered by older DEXA radiation sources (that used radioisotopes rather than x-ray generators) could  be as high as 35 mGy, considered a significant dose by radiological health standards.

Regulation

United States
The quality of DXA operators varies widely. DXA is not regulated like other radiation-based imaging techniques because of its low dosage. Each US state has a different policy as to what certifications are needed to operate a DXA machine. California, for example, requires coursework and a state-run test, whereas Maryland has no requirements for DXA technicians. Many states require a training course and certificate from the International Society of Clinical Densitometry (ISCD).

Australia
In Australia, regulation differs according to the applicable state or territory. For example, in Victoria, an individual performing DXA scans is required to completed a recognised course in safe use of bone mineral densitometers. In NSW and QLD a DXA technician only requires prior study in science, nursing or other related undergraduate study. The Environmental Protection Agency (EPA) oversees licensing of technicians, however, this is far from rigorous and regulation is non-existent.

References

External links 

 Non-invasive testing of bone density explained
 Information for patients, from RSNA
 Bone Densitometry explained

Radiology
Medical imaging

es:Densitometría osea